Hugh L. Fraser  (born 10 July 1952) is a Canadian sprinter and jurist. He competed in the men's 200 metres at the 1976 Summer Olympics.  He finished third in the 1975 Pan American Games 4 × 100 metres relay (with Marvin Nash, Albin Dukowski, and Bob Martin). Fraser also finished fifth in the 200 metres and sixth in the 100 metres at the 1975 Pan American Games. He was in the first induction of the Lisgar Collegiate Institute Athletic Wall of Fame, as part of the 160th Anniversary celebrations.

Fraser obtained his juris doctor degree in 1977. After working as a barrister in private practice, Fraser was appointed as a judge of the Ontario Court of Justice in 1993, where he served for 25 years, eventually becoming regional senior justice. He also served on the Canadian Human Rights Tribunal and the Dubin Commission of Inquiry (established in the aftermath of the Ben Johnson doping scandal).

He is the father of ice hockey player Mark Fraser.

References

External links
 
 1975 Pan American 4 x 100 metres relay final

1952 births
Living people
Athletes (track and field) at the 1976 Summer Olympics
Canadian male sprinters
Olympic track and field athletes of Canada
Athletes (track and field) at the 1975 Pan American Games
Pan American Games bronze medalists for Canada
Pan American Games medalists in athletics (track and field)
Athletes (track and field) at the 1978 Commonwealth Games
Commonwealth Games competitors for Canada
Black Canadian track and field athletes
Jamaican emigrants to Canada
Sportspeople from Kingston, Jamaica
Judges in Ontario
Ben Johnson doping case
Athletes from Ottawa
Lisgar Collegiate Institute alumni
Medalists at the 1975 Pan American Games
Officers of the Order of Canada
21st-century Canadian people
20th-century Canadian people